West Palm Beach Christian Convention Center (originally known as West Palm Beach Auditorium) is a 5,000-seat multi-purpose arena in West Palm Beach, Florida, at the intersection of North Congress Avenue and Palm Beach Lakes Boulevard. It was built in 1965 as the West Palm Beach Auditorium and was designed by famed architect Bertrand Goldberg. It was home to the West Palm Beach Blaze ice hockey team, Florida Bobcats arena football team and Florida Hammerheads roller hockey team. It hosted the twelfth WWF In Your House pay-per-view in 1996.  The Fort Lauderdale Strikers played their indoor soccer games here in the early 1980s. It was also host to innumerable concerts from different rock acts.

The facility was sold in the late 1990s to the Watchtower Bible and Tract Society, Inc., the main legal entity used by Jehovah's Witnesses. The building and grounds were renovated and the name was changed to West Palm Beach Christian Convention Center and is now used only for their assemblies and conventions.

References

1965 establishments in Florida
American Basketball Association venues
Defunct indoor arenas in Florida
Bertrand Goldberg buildings
Music venues in Florida
Defunct indoor soccer venues in the United States
Fort Lauderdale Strikers arenas
Indoor ice hockey venues in Florida
Defunct sports venues in Florida
North American Soccer League (1968–1984) indoor venues
Sports venues completed in 1965
Florida Hammerheads